"Apocalypse, Nowish" is episode 7 of season 4 in the television show Angel. Written by Steven S. DeKnight and directed by Vern Gillum, it was originally broadcast on November 17, 2002 on the WB network. The WB referred to this episode as "Rain of Fire" when it was first aired, which DeKnight attributes to "legal issues" over the title's reference to the 1979 film Apocalypse Now.

In "Apocalypse, Nowish", Angel Investigations deals with a sudden wave of paranormal activity all over Los Angeles, portending the rise of the apocalyptic beast of whom Cordelia has been experiencing visions. As the Beast rises from the bowels of the Earth to bring a rain of fire over the city, Cordelia and Connor make love.

Plot
Cordelia tells Angel that she still loves him, but that during her time as a higher power she saw and felt all the carnage he formerly wrought as Angelus. She now needs him to give her time to sort out her feelings. When Lorne wants to learn what Cordelia remembers about her time as a higher power, Angel insists that they wait.

Connor comforts Cordelia after another nightmare featuring the demon from her visions. Meanwhile, as Angel Investigations is flooded with calls involving paranormal activity all over Los Angeles, Wesley returns home after fighting a bug infestation to find Lilah dressed as Fred for sexual role-playing.

Suddenly, Cordelia starts breathing hard and her eyes turn white as she warns Angel that "he's coming." Cordelia lies down and tells Angel and Connor what she remembers of her vision. Back at the hotel, Lorne picks up on the strained relationship between Fred and Gunn; since they jointly sought revenge on the man who sent Fred to a hell dimension, Fred has not been able to forgive Gunn for their actions. She leaves for the diner where she and Gunn are regulars.

Angel goes to Wolfram & Hart to demand that Lilah return the information the law firm sucked out of Lorne's head about the impending apocalypse. Cordelia and Connor walk to an alleyway that Cordelia recognizes as the place where Connor was born, where Darla staked herself. A large, horned demon bursts from the ground before them, knocking them both down. Connor attacks, but he takes a brutal beating before the demon strides away. Cordelia tends to Connor's wounds and finds that he has broken ribs.

At the diner, a waitress tries to advise Fred on her relationship troubles, until an earthquake shatters the diner's windows.  Meanwhile, unable to locate Fred, Gunn is restless and tries to leave to find her, but Wesley appears and interrupts his departure. Aware of all the strange occurrences around town, he offers to work with them to deal with this problem, but Gunn's too angry with Wesley to even consider the idea. Angel stops them all from leaving because he has information from Lilah that they must study to prevent the end of the world. The trio examine the pages containing information stolen earlier from Lorne's brain. Another call is taken by Lorne and Angel instructs him to start mapping the locations from where the calls originate. The pages make no sense until Gunn sees that the pages fit together like a puzzle. Rearranging the sheets reveals a symbol shaped like a square with an "X" inside representing the "Eye of Fire." Lorne makes another discovery: the mapped locations of strange occurrences form the same pattern.  Angel and the gang determine that the location on the map that appears at the middle of the X is a popular club on a high rooftop. They arrive at the club to find a mass of dead bodies and the Beast waiting for them.

Angel and the team take on the demon but are overpowered. Crossbows, axes, and swords don't have much impact, so Wesley tries a series of guns that also fail. Angel renews the battle and manages to send the demon to its knees, until the demon stakes him in the neck. The demon sends Angel flying off the roof to the city street. The demon forms the Eye of Fire using the dead bodies and sets them ablaze. Angel rips the stake from his neck and slowly begins to recover.

The fire on the roof rises towards the sky and soon fire starts to rain down as Connor and Cordelia watch. Connor blames himself for the whole situation, but Cordelia comforts and reassures him that he's not to blame. Cordelia kisses Connor and offers him the chance to feel something real. While everyone else watches the fire, fearing the future that awaits them, Connor and Cordelia have sex. Connor is seeking comfort in her arms. Angel is shown to be observing through the window on top of a nearby building.

Production
Executive producer Jeffrey Jackson Bell employed the effects shop Almost Human to design Vladimir Kulich's costuming and make-up. Almost Human makeup designer Chris Burdett says it took 2–3 days for four people to sculpt the costume and another 7 hours to fill and shape the huge fiberglass mold; a life cast was made of Kulich so that the suit would fit him exactly. The night before shooting was to begin, the crew finally established the costume's paint scheme. Kulich went through an eight-hour make-up process to transform him into the character of the Beast, including prosthetics and fiberglass body suit, but "The worst part was the contact lenses...[that] cover the entire eyeball," the actor said. However, the isolating nature of the 50 lb costume meant that "I was able to search a little deeper for material while I was in the character because I was cocooned off...It was liberating." Writer Steven S. DeKnight says all the full-suit shots of the Beast feature stunt double Scott Workman. They cut to Kulich only for the close-ups.

According to director Vern Gillum, "J. August Richards is terrified by rats, just like his character. This is the nicest guy in the world and it was just torment for him beyond anything you could imagine." In the final fight scene, which took two full days to film, Charisma Carpenter had to be careful doing her stunts, as she was pregnant.

Arc significance
After appearing for a split second in Cordelia's vision in the previous episode, the Beast fully appears in this episode and becomes one of Angel Investigations' most powerful foes.
Upon rising, the Beast reacts to Cordelia, foreshadowing her future role in the season.
Wesley officially rejoins the team, having been just the occasional helper since he kidnapped Connor in Season 3.
The Jasmine-possessed Cordelia's tryst with Connor will have severe ramifications, leading to her pregnancy, the eventual birth of Jasmine in embodied form, and ultimately, Cordelia's death.
Connor calls Angel "dad" for the second time, showing his growing affection for Angel (the first was his initial appearance from Quor-Toth, when he said "hi, dad")
Cordelia rejects Angel because of his actions as Angelus, but that was deception as she had already put in motion her plans to be impregnated by Connor.

Continuity
Gunn's fear of rats was first mentioned in "Heartthrob".
Fred previously went to the diner in "Couplet" and "Loyalty", both times with Gunn.
Gunn's home-made axe (made from a vehicle hubcap) is crushed by the Beast in the ensuing fight.  The axe was first seen in the season 2 episode "Dear Boy" and made numerous appearances over the next two seasons.
Cordelia dreams about The Beast attacking her, even though she is actually possessed by Jasmine.
 Two of the three prophecies given to Wesley by the Loa in the previous season are fulfilled at the end of the episode. The earth shakes and the air rains fire. The sky turning to blood is fulfilled a few episodes later when the Beast blots out the sun.

Cultural references
Apocalypse Now: The name of this episode is a play on the name of the 1979 film, which the Scooby Gang watch in the Buffy episode "Restless."
Jaws: Lorne's line, "I'm gonna need a bigger arrow" may be an allusion to Brody's line "You're gonna need a bigger boat" in the 1975 film.
The final fight scene with the Beast references many classic cinematic fighting styles, including The Matrix (the Beast deflecting arrows while the camera does a slow motion circular pan), the films of John Woo (Wesley firing two handguns while moving laterally), and Terminator 2: Judgment Day (Wesley pushing the Beast backwards with repeated shotgun blasts).

Reception
Writer Steven DeKnight says, "One of the biggest things this year has been the reaction to "Apocalypse, Nowish." Everybody loved the show, basically giving it five stars then taking three away because of the very end."  When fans speculated why Cordelia would sleep with Angel's son, DeKnight cautions, "There is a bigger reason for it that will become apparent as well... You have to remember it's a long story arc." Many people were disturbed that Cordelia slept with Connor, and Charisma Carpenter agrees: "I hear a lot of "ewwww," and I agree. It is ewwwy. Only something deplorable and devilish and truly evil could do something so horrid."

References

External links

 

Angel (season 4) episodes
2002 American television episodes